Poker is a family of card games.

Poker may also refer to:

 Poker (film), a 1951 Swedish film
 "Poker" (Malcolm in the Middle), a television episode
 "Poker" (song), a song by Electric Light Orchestra
 Fire iron or poker, a metal instrument for tending a fire
 Jeanneau Poker, a French sailboat design

See also
 Poker face (disambiguation)
 Poker Game (disambiguation)
 
 
 Pocher, a defunct Italian company making model cars and trains